Members of the 3rd National Council of Namibia, which lasts from 2004 - 2009. The chairperson is Asser Kuveri Kapere of the South West Africa People's Organization. 24 of the 26 members of the National Council are members of SWAPO, while one is from the United Democratic Front and one is from the Democratic Turnhalle Alliance. All Councillors below are SWAPO members unless otherwise stated.

Members of the 3rd National Council of Namibia by Region

Caprivi Region
 Dorothy Mareka Kabula
 Leonard Yambwa Mwilima

Hardap Region
 Theo Vivian Diergaardt
 Barakias Namwandi

Erongo Region
Chairperson: Asser Kuveri Kapere
 Hafeni Ludwigh Ndemula

ǁKaras Region
 Hilma Ndinelago Nicanor
 Willem Appollus

Khomas Region
 Vice Chairperson: Margaret Natalie Mensah-Williams
 Rosalia Mwashekele-Sibiya

Kunene Region
 Sebastian Ignatius !Gobs - United Democratic Front
 Ngohauvi Lydia Kavetu - Democratic Turnhalle Alliance

Ohangwena Region
 Johannes Kamati Nakwafila
 Ruth Kepawa Nhinda

Okavango Region
 Sebastiaan Karupu
 Frieda Mwadina Siwombe

Omaheke Region
 Stefanus Orateng Mogotsi
 Kilus Nguvauva

Omusati Region
 Jhonny Haikella Hakaye
 Leevi Shiimi Katoma

Oshana Region
 Aram Martin
 Henock ya Kasita

Oshikoto Region
 Henock Tangeni Kankoshi
 Phillemon Ndjambula

Otjozondjupa Region
 Ferdinand Frederich Kavetuna
 Bartholomeus Tuhafeni Shangheta

References

National Council (Namibia)
Government of Namibia